Kutunggu Kau Dipasar Minggu The Series (English:I'm Meet You in the Sunday Market The Series) is a soap opera that aired on RCTI in daily at 17:00–18:00 WIB, 18:00–19:00 WITA, and 19:00–20:00 WIT. This soap opera produced by SinemArt. Players such as Nikita Willy, Giorgino Abraham, Winona Willy, Cut Meyriska, Cinta Laura, and much more.

Cast 
 Nikita Willy as Niki Mihardja– Jaja and Mimin son
 Giorgino Abraham as Gio Gardian
 Winona Willy as Nona
 Cut Meyriska as Gia Gardian
 Cinta Laura as Carine
 Fero Walandouw as Fero
 Ade Surya Akbar as Dennis
 Atiq Rachman as Rocky
 Jaja Mihardja as Jaja Mihardja
 Cut Mini Theo as Mimin
 Anjasmara as Mr. Ray Gardian
 Moudy Wilhelmina as Roseline Gardian
 Yadi Timo as Jaka
 Tenno Ali as Madun
 Iqbal Pakula as Surya
 Wiwid Gunawan as Rita Britha
 Dahlia Poland as Sandry
 Gritte Agatha as Ayuni
 Intan Shofi as Siti
 Ria Probo as Susan Suwing
 Iszur Muchtar as Mr. Sarip 
 Shinta Muin as Mak Uti
 Dudun Arjuna as Sanip
 Aspar Paturuzi as Ustad
 Samuel Zylgwyn as Sam
 Paramitha Rusady as Sari
 Sinyo Rudi as Toto

International broadcasts

External links 
 Official Page SinemArt

Indonesian television soap operas